Margaret Stiefvater (Hummel) is an American writer of young adult fiction, known mainly for her series of fantasy novels The Wolves of Mercy Falls and The Raven Cycle. She currently lives in Virginia.

Life and career

Early life 

As a child, Stiefvater was a voracious reader who enjoyed writing. By age 16, she was submitting manuscripts to publishers. After being home-schooled from sixth grade on, Stiefvater attended Mary Washington College, graduating with a B.A. in history. By the time she had entered college, she had already written over 30 novels, including four thrillers about the Irish Republican Army, a historical blockade runner novel, and a high-fantasy novel about "impassioned enchanters fighting among civil unrest." At 16, she legally changed her first name to Margaret. Her maiden name was Hummel. After graduating, she worked as a portrait artist, specializing in equestrian art. In 2010, she gave a TEDx Talk for NASA entitled "How Bad Teens Become Famous People", in which she reflects on her youth as a "Bad Teen" and how those years have impacted her.

Writing career 

Stiefvater published her first novel, Lament, in 2008. Before Lament had been released, she sold the rights to Ballad, the sequel to Lament, and to Shiver, the first book in the trilogy The Wolves of Mercy Falls. Shiver spent more than 40 weeks on The New York Times Best Seller list. There are over 1.7 million copies of The Wolves of Mercy Falls series in print and more than thirty-six foreign editions have been licensed.

In 2011, Stiefvater published The Scorpio Races, which received 5 starred reviews and was named a Michael L. Printz Award Honor Book.

Stiefvater has been very open about sharing her techniques and methods when writing. She has a series of blog posts entitled "how i write" describing her different approaches and sharing advice. In 2018 and 2019, Maggie Stiefvater gave writing seminars entitled Portraits & Dreams: Writing with Maggie Stiefvater. It included a lecture and a Q&A. She gave this lecture in Edinburgh, New York City, Seattle, Austin, Los Angeles, Brooklyn, Toronto, and Vancouver.

Music 
Stiefvater plays various musical instruments. She recorded original compositions for the audio books of The Scorpio Races and The Raven Cycle.  She has a SoundCloud account where she releases her original tracks. Stiefvater is very connected to music and has released playlists for some of her novels of songs she listened to while writing.

Art 

Before turning to writing full-time, Stiefvater was a professional portrait artist, specializing in colored pencil. She currently has her own Etsy page and Society6 page where she sells her original art.

Stiefvater also created a Tarot card deck, The Raven's Prophecy Tarot Cards, in September 2015.

She was asked to create a poster for the American Library Association to promote reading. The poster includes characters from The Raven Cycle and the phrase "The future belongs to those who read."

Cars 
Stiefvater greatly enjoys cars, especially fast ones. She has completed a stunt driving class. She has worked as an automotive journalist.

Stiefvater has frequently used her passion for vehicles to promote her novels. To promote the second book of The Raven Cycle, The Dream Thieves, Stiefvater spray-painted her own car. She later allowed fans to also spray-paint the vehicle at the book's launch in Kansas City on September 18, 2013.  She repeated this for another event in October 2016, where she let fans paint her Mitsubishi Lancer Evolution X. In 2013 Stiefvater went rally racing in a race car printed with the cover of The Raven Boys.

In 2015, Stiefvater drove her Mitsubishi Lancer Evolution X in a race against fellow author John Green at the Princeton Speedway. Both their vehicles caught fire.

Personal life 

Stiefvater has a personal blog where she shares her life events. Stiefvater is married to a "straight-laced husband" and has two children. She has four dogs named Winnie, Parsifal, Jane, and Rose. She also has nine goats and a horse.

Bibliography

Novels

Books of Faerie 
Lament (2008)
Ballad (2009)
Requiem (TBD)

The Wolves of Mercy Falls 

Shiver (2009)
Linger (2010)
Forever (2011)
Sinner (2014)

The Raven Cycle 

The Raven Boys (2012)
The Dream Thieves (2013)
Blue Lily, Lily Blue (2014)
The Raven King (2016)
Opal (2018)

The Dreamer Trilogy 
Call Down The Hawk (2019)
Mister Impossible (2021)
Greywaren (2022)
Pip Bartlett - with Jackson Pearce

 Pip Bartlett's Guide to Magical Creatures (2015)
 Pip Bartlett's Guide to Unicorn Training (2017)
 Pip Bartlett's Guide to Sea Monsters (2018)

Other novels
The Scorpio Races (2011)
Spirit Animals Book 2: Hunted (2014)
All the Crooked Saints (2017)
Bravely (2022)

Anthologies 
The Curiosities: A Collection of Stories - with Tessa Gratton and Brenna Yovanoff (2012)
The Anatomy of Curiosity - with Tessa Gratton and Brenna Yovanoff (2015)

Short fiction 
The Hounds of Ulster (2010) - a short story in the anthology Kiss Me Deadly: 13 Tales of Paranormal Love
Non Quis, Sed Quid (2011)

Graphic Novels 

 Swamp Thing: Twin Branches - with artist Morgan Beem (October 2020)

Film adaptations 
Unique Features, in association with Paramountoptioned Shivers film rights shortly after the book was released. A screenplay was written by Nick Pustay.

It was reported in 2011 that David Katzenberg and Seth Grahame-Smith’s KatzSmith Productions would produce a film of Scorpio Races. New Line Cinema, in conjunction with Weed Road, optioned the film rights for The Raven Boys shortly before the book's release in September 2012.

In 2019, Stiefvater wrote the pilot for a TV show of The Raven Cycle.

 Recognition 

 Shiver 
 Debuted at #9 on the New York Times bestseller list
 Indies Choice Book Award Finalist
 ALA 2010 Best Books for Young Adults
 ALA Quick Pick for Reluctant Readers
 Amazon Top Ten Books for Teens
 Publishers Weekly Best Books of 2009
 Border's Original Voices Pick & Finalist
 Barnes & Noble 2009 Top Twenty Books for Teens
 CBC Children's Choice Awards Finalist
 2010 SIBA Book Award, Finalist
 Glamour's Best Book to Curl Up With
 VOYA's Perfect Ten, 2009
 BDB Top Young Reads of 2009

 Lament 
 ALA 2010 Popular Paperbacks for Young Adults
 ALA 2010 Best Books for Young Adults
 SIBA Book Award Nominee
 Starred review, Publishers Weekly
 Starred review, Booklist
 Starred review, KLIATT

 The Scorpio Races 
Michael L. Printz Award Honor, 2012
The Odyssey Honor Award 2012 for Best Audio Production
Los Angeles Times Book Times Award Finalist, 2012
ALA Notable Books for Children, 2012
The New York Times Notable Children's Books of 2011
Publishers Weekly Best Children's Books of 2011
Chicago Public Library's Best of the Best, 2012
Amazon's Best Books for Teens 2011
School Library Journal'''s Best Books of the YearKirkus Best Teen Books of the Year (2011) Horn Book'' Best Books of 2011
Children's Book Committee 2012 Best Children's Books of the Year
Finalist, 2012 Mythopoeic Fantasy Award for Children's Literature
YALSA Top Ten Best Fiction for Young Adults, 2012
YALSA Amazing Audiobooks for Young Adults, 2012
2012 NCTE/ CLA Notable Children's Book in the English Language Arts

The Raven Boys 
Number 1 NYT Bestselling Series
TIME Magazine Season's Most Anticipated Reads
Junior Library Guild Selection
Amazon Books Editors' Selection: Fall Favorites
Autumn 2012 Kids' Indie Next List Pick
Winner of AudioFile Earphones Award
Bram Stoker Award nominee

The Dream Thieves 
Detcon1 Member Choice Award for Young Adult Fiction
School Library Journal's Best Books of 2013
Chapters-Indigo Best Books of 2013

Blue Lily, Lily Blue 
 TIME Magazine Season's Most Anticipated Reads
 Publishers Weekly Best Books of 2012
 Junior Library Guild Selection
 Amazon Books Editors' Selection: Fall Favorites
 2013 YALSA Top Ten Best Fiction for Young Adults
 Autumn 2012 Kids' Indie Next List Pick
 Winner of AudioFile Earphones Award
 Audiofile's Best Audiobooks of the Year for 2012
 Indigo Top 25 of 2012
 BCCB Blue Ribbons 2012
 Leserpreis 2013, Best Fantasy
 One of Rolling Stone's Best 40 YA Novels

See also

References

External links 

 
 Merry Sisters of Fate: Fiction that Runs with Scissors blog by Tessa Gratton, Stiefvater, Brenna Yovanoff
 Stiefvater at Live Journal (to August 21, 2013)
 Steifvater at Greywaren Art  (to August 5, 2009; art blog to September 2008)
 
 

21st-century American novelists
American fantasy writers
American women novelists
American writers of young adult literature
Novelists from Virginia
Living people
Year of birth missing (living people)
Women science fiction and fantasy writers
21st-century American women writers
Women writers of young adult literature
People from Harrisonburg, Virginia
University of Mary Washington alumni
Writers from Virginia